The Northern Illinois Huskies women's soccer team is the college soccer team that represents Northern Illinois University (NIU) in DeKalb, Illinois, United States. The school's team currently competes in the Mid-American Conference (MAC). NIU women's soccer started playing in 1993 and are coached by Julie Colhoff.

Roster
As of May 2017.

Coaching staff
.

Achievements
 Mid-American Conference Tournament:
 Winners (2): 1997, 1998
 Runners-up (2): 2006, 2016
 Semifinals (2): 2007, 2014
 Quarterfinals (5): 1999, 2008, 2010, 2012, 2013
 Mid-American Conference Regular Season:
 Winners (2): 1997, 1998

Honors

All-Americans
NIU women's soccer has had one player named to the Soccer Buzz All-America team.

Academic All-Americans
NIU women's soccer has had a combined 3 players named to CoSIDA and NSCAA Academic All-America teams, including one First-Team Academic All-American.

Players of the Year
NIU women's soccer has had two players named Player of the Year by the conference.

Coaches of the Year
NIU women's soccer has had two head coaches named Coach of the Year by the conference.

See also
NIU Huskies men's soccer
Mid-American Conference Women's Soccer Tournament
NCAA Division I Women's Soccer Championship

References

External links